Marguerite Wood (30 August 1887 – 19 August 1954) was a Scottish historian and archivist who specialised in Scottish history. She served as Keeper of the Burgh Records of Edinburgh and was a Fellow of the Royal Historical Society and a member of the Scottish Records Advisory Council.

Early life and education 
Marguerite Wood was born in Edinburgh on 30 August 1887. Her family had a strong interest in history: her great-grandfather John Philip Wood (1762–1838) published a history of Cramond and her paternal grandfather John George Wood (1804–65), was a member of an antiquarian society, the Spaulding Club. Her maternal grandfather was Hugh Lyon Tennent a founding member of the Edinburgh Calotype Club.

Wood studied French at the University of Edinburgh,  gaining a master's degree in 1913. During the First World War she served in the Women's Army Auxiliary Core (which became known as Queen Mary's Army Auxiliary Corp in 1918) in France. The actual dates of her service are not known, although there is some speculation that she may have joined following the death of her only brother at the Battle of Passchendaele in 1917 and she had returned to Edinburgh by 1920. At that time she resumed her historical studies under the supervision of Professor R. K. Hannay, Sir William Fraser Professor of Scottish History and Palaeography. This culminated in a two-volume edition of the foreign correspondence of Marie de Lorraine, mother of Mary, Queen of Scots, for which she was awarded a Ph.D. from the University of Edinburgh in 1925. This was an unusual achievement for a women: only four women were awarded the Ph.D. in history from the University of Edinburgh prior to the Second World War. Following publication of the work by Edinburgh University Press, G. P. Insh, in his review, noted the value of her scholarship in situating 16th-century Scottish history within its European context.

Professional career 
After completing her Ph.D., she was appointed to the Edinburgh Town Clerk's office, where she contributed to the Extracts from the Records of the Burgh of Edinburgh 1589–1603 by A. Grierson, published in 1927. She then became the Keeper of the Burgh Records of Edinburgh (now Edinburgh City Archives), continuing in this role until 1954.

During the summer of 1937 she "had the privilege of assisting Miss Grant [Isabel Frances Grant, founder of the Highland Folk Museum] in Am Fasgadh".

The 1920s–30s was also a significant period in the development of Scottish archaeology, and saw the publication of the first authoritative guidebooks to national heritage sites. James Richardson, Scotland's first Inspector of Ancient Monuments, invited Marguerite Wood to coauthor the first guidebook, to Edinburgh Castle, in 1929. Their collaboration proved successful, and they went on to develop guidebooks on Melrose Abbey and Dryburgh Abbey in 1932.

Honours 
Wood was both a Member of the Scottish Records Advisory Council, and a Fellow of the Royal Historical Society.

Selected publications 
 Wood, Marguerite, 'The Imprisonment of the Earl of Arran', Scottish Historical Review, 24:94 (January 1927), pp. 116–122.
 Wood, Marguerite, Extracts from the Records of the Burgh of Edinburgh 1604-1626, Edinburgh, Oliver and Boyd, 1931
 Wood, Marguerite, and Scottish History Society. Flodden Papers : Diplomatic Correspondence between the Courts of France and Scotland : 1507–1517. Edinburgh: Printed at the UP by T. and A. Constable for the Scottish History Society, 1933. Print. Publications of the Scottish History Society; 3rd Ser., v. 20.
 Wood, Marguerite, ''Hammermen of the Canongate', Book of Old Edinburgh Club, vol. 19 (Edinburgh, 1933), pp. 1–30.
 Wood, Marguerite, Canongate, and Scottish Record Society. Book of Records of the Ancient Privileges of the Canongate. Edinburgh: Scottish Record Society, 1955. Print. Scottish Record Society (Ser.); 85.
 Richardson, J. S., and Marguerite Wood. Edinburgh Castle. Edinburgh: H.M. Stationery Office, 1929. Second Edition 1948
 Wood, Marguerite. The Scott Monument : Edinburgh. Edinburgh: Edinburgh Corporation, 1949.
 Richardson, J. S., and Marguerite Wood. Melrose Abbey, Roxburghshire. Edinburgh: His Majesty's Stationery Office. Official Guide (Great Britain. Department of Ancient Monuments and Historic Buildings). 1932. Second Edition 1949
 Richardson, J. S., and Marguerite Wood. Dryburgh Abbey, Berwickshire. Edinburgh: His Majesty's Stationery Office. Official Guide (Great Britain. Department of Ancient Monuments and Historic Buildings). 1937. Second Edition 1948
 Richardson, J. S., Marguerite Wood, and Great Britain. Scottish Development Department. Historic Buildings Monuments. Dryburgh Abbey, Berwickshire. Edinburgh: H.M.S.O., 1932.

References 

1887 births
1954 deaths
Alumni of the University of Edinburgh
Women historians
Historians of Scotland
20th-century Scottish women writers
Fellows of the Royal Historical Society